The Bracco Italiano is an Italian breed of pointing dog.

History 

The first dog registered by the Kennel Club Italiano, founded in 1882, was a Bracco Italiano. The breed was fully accepted by the Fédération Cynologique Internationale in 1956.

In the 41 years from 1970 to 2011, a total of 24,613 of the dogs were registered. From 2010 to 2018 there were approximately 700 new registrations per year in Italy, of which in every year the majority were of white-and-orange colouration.

Description

The Bracco Italiano is roughly square in outline – the height at the withers is almost as great as the length of the body. The head is large, with long ears and long upper lips that hang below the lower jaw.

The coat is dense and short. It may be white, or white with patches of either orange or brown, or white with orange or brown roaning. Any other colour, including black or tricolour markings, is considered  disqualifying fault. The most usual colours are bianco-arancio (white-and-orange) and roano-marrone (liver roan).

See also
 Dogs portal
 List of dog breeds

Notes

References 

FCI breeds
Gundogs
Pointers
Dog breeds originating in Italy
Rare dog breeds